Brenda Joyce may refer to:

Brenda Joyce (author) (born c. 1963), American writer
Brenda Joyce (actress) (1917–2009), American film actress